Deep Breath (Persian:نفس عمیق) is a 2003 Iranian film directed by Parviz Shahbazi. The film won the Crystal Simorgh for Best Screenplay at the 2003 Fajr International Film Festival and the FIPRESCI Prize at the 2003 Pusan International Film Festival. The film was also Iran's official submission for the Best Foreign Language Film Academy Award in 2004.

References

External links

The Photo gallery of the film at Cinemaema.com

Iranian romantic drama films
2003 films
2000s Persian-language films
Films whose writer won the Best Screenplay Crystal Simorgh
2003 romantic drama films